The Tetovo dialect  (Tetovski dijalekt) is a member of the western subgroup of the northern group of dialects of Macedonian. It is considered part of the transitional Torlakian dialects. It is spoken by the population in the north-western part of North Macedonia. This dialect is spoken in the city of Tetovo, Brvenica and  Jegunovce Municipality (without the villages Vratnica, Belovište, Staro Selo and Rogačevo who speak the Vratnica dialect). One of the main characteristics of this dialect is the use of the words таќе (taḱe) – "on that way" and ваќе (vaḱe) – "on this way". The Tetovo dialect can be found in several books, two of which were written by Kiril Peychinovich, namely Ogledalo and Uteshenia greshnim.

Phonological characteristics
There are many characteristics that are connected with this dialect but the most significant are:
the old vocal L is replaced by the groups u/ lu/ la: јаболко / jabolko > јабука / jabuka (apple), солза / solza > слăза / sluza (tear);
use of A instead of E: трева  / treva > трава / trava (grass), орев / orev > орав / orav (nut);
use of ă instead of use of the yer: лаже / laže > лăже / lăže (lie);
use of U instead of the Old Church Slavonic letter ON: пат / pat > пут / put (road), внук / vnuk >  унук / unuk (nephew).

Morphological characteristics
use of the suffix -mo for first person plural: одиме / odime > идемо/ idemo (we are going);
palatal J before the letter E at the beginning of a word: јазик / jazik> језик / jezik (tongue), јаже > јуже (rope);
the consonant group MN is replaced with the consonant group ML: многу / mnogu > млогу / mlogu (too much);
use of the preposition U instead of the preposition VO: во град/ vo grad > у град / u grad (in city)

Examples
Below is written a popular folk song from Tetovo region. The song is in Tetovo dialect.

References

Dialects of the Macedonian language
Tetovo Municipality
Jegunovce Municipality
Tearce Municipality
Brvenica Municipality